Pantai Dalam is a residential area located south-west of Kuala Lumpur, under the parliamentary constituency of Lembah Pantai. Represented in Dewan Rakyat by Parti Keadilan Rakyat (PKR), Fahmi Fadzil. The name Pantai Dalam derived from Kampung Pam Thai Dalam which was initially known for the sewerage treatment plant located at the heart of Pantai.

Demographics
Most of the areas residents are blue-collar workers living in flats that had been sold to them under the People's Housing Project when they were resettled from their squatter homes; students of the University of Malaya; and police officers and related personnel, mainly in Desa Aman 1 & 2.

The population is made up of 49% Malays, 19% Chinese and 32% Indians. Some squatters are still waiting to buy homes under this project, which was announced by Prime Minister Abdullah Ahmad Badawi prior to the 2008 general election.

Pantai Dalam is well connected to the other parts of Klang Valley via the New Pantai Expressway and the Federal Highway.

Transportation
Public transport in Pantai Dalam covers a variety of transport modes such as bus, rail and taxi. Buses include RapidKL buses and Go KL City Bus. Rail service is available from KTM Komuter at  Pantai Dalam Komuter station,  Petaling Komuter station, and  Angkasapuri Komuter station and from the Kelana Jaya Line at  Kerinchi LRT station,  Abdullah Hukum LRT station, and  Universiti LRT station.

Neighborhoods
There are many smaller residential areas that form the larger area of Pantai Dalam, including:
 The Park Residences
 Pantai Hillpark
 Kampung Pantai
 PPR Sri Pantai
 PPR Pantai Ria
 PPR Sri Cempaka
 PPR Kerinchi
 Desa Aman 1 & 2
 Pantai Murni
 Pantai Permai
 Taman Bukit Angkasa
 Pantai Baru
 Kampung Pasir
 Taman Pantai Dalam
 Taman Pantai Indah
 PPR Kampung Limau
 Pantai Panorama Condominium
 Capri by Fraser
 Camellia Serviced Apartment
 KL Gateway 
 Kondo Rakyat Desa Pantai
 Pantai Sentral Park

Suburbs in Kuala Lumpur